Léonce Angrand (8 August 1808 - 11 January 1886) was a French painter and draughtsman. While serving as vice-consul in Lima, Angrand "Produced albums of watercolours and drawings of cities such as Arica, Arequipa, Lima, Cuzco, Ollantaytambo, Urubamba and Tacna". According to the National Library of France, Agrand served as Consul to Edinburgh 1832–1839, and to different locations in Latin America from 1839 to 1842 and 1845 to 1856.

Notes

External links

1808 births
1886 deaths
19th-century French painters
French male painters
19th-century French diplomats
19th-century French male artists